The men's 100 metre butterfly at the 2013 IPC Swimming World Championships was held at the Parc Jean Drapeau Aquatic Complex in Montreal from 12–18 August.

Medalists

See also
List of IPC world records in swimming

References

butterfly 100 m men